Coal Aston is a village in the county of Derbyshire, in England. It is by the town of Dronfield.

Geography 
Coal Aston sits on a ridge overlooking Sheffield and Dronfield. To the south there is Frith Wood, which is made up of mixed woodland rich in many species of fauna and flora and is thought to be an ancient wood. The wood is now a conservation area and although it is spelt Frith Wood on, for example, Ordnance Survey maps, many locals call it Firth wood as in the neighbouring Firthwood Road. The wood is now popular for the William Hale trail.   The name Coal Aston is due to the number of walk-in coal mines in the area, finally closing in 1938. There are many stone-built houses and terraces dating back to the mining era during the 19th century. The last mine, Sicklebrook Colliery on Sicklebrook Lane (off Eckington Road), closed in 1938. There is still an Aston Hall in the centre of the village. The large Victorian village school has now been converted into a private house. During World War II the village was the site of a prisoner-of-war camp.

References

External links
 http://www.dronfield.gov.uk/uploads/coal-aston-character-statement-part-1.pdf

Villages in Derbyshire
Towns and villages of the Peak District
Dronfield
North East Derbyshire District